The 1955 Ontario general election was held on June 9, 1955, to elect the 98 members of the 25th Legislative Assembly of Ontario (Members of Provincial Parliament, or "MPPs") of the Province of Ontario.

The Ontario Progressive Conservative Party, led by Leslie Frost, won a fifth consecutive term in office, increasing its caucus in the legislature from 79 in the previous election to 83.

The Ontario Liberal Party, again led by Farquhar Oliver, won three additional seats in the enlarged legislature, increasing its caucus from 8 to 11, and continuing in the role of official opposition. Liberal-Labour MPP Albert Wren was re-elected and continued to sit with the Liberal caucus.

The social democratic Co-operative Commonwealth Federation (CCF), led by Donald C. MacDonald, won one additional seat, for a total of three.

The Labor-Progressive Party (which was the Communist Party) lost its last remaining seat with the defeat of J.B. Salsberg.

One "PC Independent" was elected.

Expansion of Legislative Assembly
For the first time since the 1934 election, the number of seats in the Legislature was adjusted, rising from 90 to 98. The following changes were made:

 Addington became Frontenac—Addington
 London was divided into London North and London South
 Muskoka—Ontario was reduced to Muskoka, ceding its part of Ontario County to Ontario
 Nickel Belt was separated from Sudbury
 Oshawa was separated from Ontario
 Ottawa West was carved out from Carleton
 Wellington North became Wellington—Dufferin
 Part of Wentworth became Wentworth East
 York Centre was carved out from York North
 York—Humber was separated from York West
 York—Scarborough was ceded from York East

Results

|-
! colspan=2 rowspan=2 | Political party
! rowspan=2 | Party leader
! colspan=5 | MPPs
! colspan=3 | Votes
|-
! Candidates
!1951
!Dissol.
!1955
!±
!#
!%
! ± (pp)

|style="text-align:left;"|Leslie Frost
|97
|79
|
|83
|4
|846,592
|48.06%
|0.40

|style="text-align:left;"|Farquhar Oliver
|94
|7
|
|10
|3
|577,774
|32.80%
|1.74

|style="text-align:left;"|Donald C. MacDonald
|81
|2
|
|3
|1
|291,410
|16.54%
|2.56

|style="text-align:left;"|Stewart Smith
|31
|1
|
|–
|1
|20,875
|1.19%
|0.52

|style="text-align:left;"|
|2
|1
|
|1
|
|7,305
|0.41%
|0.04

|style="text-align:left;"|
|1
|–
|–
|1
|1
|7,033
|0.40%
|0.34

|style="text-align:left;"|
|5
|–
|–
|–
|
|9,169
|0.52%
|0.41

|style="text-align:left;"|
|1
|–
|–
|–
|
|641
|0.04%
|

|style="text-align:left;"|
|1
|–
|–
|–
|
|602
|0.03%
|

|style="text-align:left;"|Socialist-Labour
|style="text-align:left;"|
|1
|–
|–
|–
|
|124
|0.01%
|

|style="text-align:left;"|
|–
|–
|–
|–
|
|colspan="3"|Did not campaign

|colspan="3"|
|
|colspan="5"|
|-style="background:#E9E9E9;"
|colspan="3" style="text-align:left;"|Total
|314
|90
|90
|98
|
|1,761,525
|100.00%
|
|-
|colspan="8" style="text-align:left;"|Blank and invalid ballots
|align="right"|22,622
|style="background:#E9E9E9;" colspan="2"|
|-style="background:#E9E9E9;"
|colspan="8" style="text-align:left;"|Registered voters / turnout
|2,905,760
|61.40%
|4.17
|}

Reorganization of ridings
The reorganized ridings returned the following MLAs:

Seats that changed hands

There were 10 seats that changed allegiance in the election.

 PC to Liberal
Bruce
Kent East
Oxford
Waterloo North
Wellington South

 PC to CCF
York South

 PC to Independent-PC
Renfrew South

 Liberal to PC
Niagara Falls
Ottawa East

 CCF to PC
Cochrane South

 Labor-Progressive to PC
St. Andrew

See also
Politics of Ontario
List of Ontario political parties
Premier of Ontario
Leader of the Opposition (Ontario)

References

1955 elections in Canada
1955
1955 in Ontario
June 1955 events in Canada